Mister Venezuela is an annual male pageant held in Venezuela. The winner and finalists from the contest go on to represent Venezuela in many international pageants. The Mister Venezuela pageant was started under the guardianship of Osmel Sousa and María Kallay with the intent of creating a male contest with the same discipline, quality and success as its female counterpart (Miss Venezuela). The first contest was held on July 17, 1996 and the winner was contestant number 20, José Gregorio Faría.

In the fifth edition, aired November 22, 2000, 26 men represented every state and region in Venezuela; they wore scarfs rather than the sashes used in female pageants. Due to political issues in 2002, the seventh pageant was postponed and held in 2003.

In 2012, during a private ceremony hosted by Osmel Sousa, the President of Mister and Miss Venezuela Organization; Jesús Zambrano was elected as the new Mister Venezuela 2012.

Titleholders
Color key

The winner of Mister Venezuela traditionally competes at the Mister World pageant.

Mister World Venezuela
Color Key

Mister International Venezuela
Color Key

Mister Supranational Venezuela
Color Key

Mister Global Venezuela
Color Key

References

See also
 Miss Venezuela
 Manhunt International
 Mister International
 Mister World

Venezuela
Beauty pageants in Venezuela
Recurring events established in 1996
1996 establishments in Venezuela
Venezuelan awards
Mister Global by country